Nenjathai Killadhey is a Tamil soap opera that aired on Zee Tamizh. It premiered on 23 June 2014. The show marked the comeback of S. P. B. Charan who plays the male lead, while Gayathri stars as the female lead. It was directed by D.Vijaya Bhaskar and Prabhu Panth and produced by Chithra Mahal. The show last aired on 13 March 2015, ending with 181 episodes.

Plot
The story revolves around Murali and Sujatha who are past their marriage age but not married. Sujatha works as the manager in a bank. Murali also works as an officer in the same bank. Murali wishes to marry an old girl, Kavya, after he gets his third and final sister Sandya married. But he realizes he is too old for her when he overhears her talking to her boyfriend Sidharth. Murali decides to help Kavya marry Sidharth and in the process becomes close to Sujatha. They both join hands to execute this young couple's marriage and eventually fall in love with each other. It then showcases the numerous created situations that play havoc in the couple's relationship. The show includes incidents to create curiosity. Will Sujatha and Murali be able to lead a normal married life?

Cast
 S. P. B. Charan as Murali
 Gayathiri as Sujatha
 Shampavi
 Renuka
 Kutty as Brinda
 Sonia as Archana
 Manjula as Sandhya
 Gokul as Santhanam
 Shravesh as Nandu

Airing history 
The show started airing on Zee Tamil on 23 June 2014 and It aired on Monday through Friday 7:00 pm IST. Later its timing changed Starting from Monday 24 November 2014, the show was shifted to 8:00 pm and from Monday 16 February 2015, the show was shifted to 5:30 pm time Slot.

See also
 List of programs broadcast by Zee Tamil

References

External links
 

Zee Tamil original programming
Tamil-language romance television series
2014 Tamil-language television series debuts
Tamil-language television shows
2015 Tamil-language television series endings
Television shows set in Tamil Nadu